Posse is a German and Swedish surname. Notable people with the name include:

 Abel Posse, Argentinian writer
 Amelie Posse, Swedish writer
 Arvid Posse, (1820–1901), Prime Minister of Sweden
 Arvid Mauritz Posse,  (1792–1850), Swedish Prime Minister for Justice and Marshal of the Realm
 Knut Posse (chatelain) (died 1500), chatelain of the fief of Viborg
 Knut Posse, Swedish Commander killed at the Battle  of Brunkeberg
 Knut Göransson Posse (ca 1645–1714), Governor of Stockholm
 Konstantin Posse, (1847–1928), Russian mathematician, student of Pafnuty Chebyshev
 Vladimir Posse (1864–1940), Russian socialist journalist
 Hans Posse (1879–1942), special envoy of the Führermuseum

German-language surnames
Swedish-language surnames